Jasraj Kundi (born 6 July 1999) is a Kenyan cricketer. In September 2019, he was named in Kenya's squad for the 2019 ICC T20 World Cup Qualifier tournament in the United Arab Emirates. Prior to his selection for the 2019 T20 tournament, he was named in Kenya's squad for the 2018 Under-19 Cricket World Cup. He made his Twenty20 International (T20I) debut for Kenya, against the Netherlands, on 18 October 2019.

References

External links
 

1999 births
Living people
Kenyan cricketers
Kenya Twenty20 International cricketers
Place of birth missing (living people)